The United States men's national wheelchair basketball team began in 1955 when the Pam Am Jets brought wheelchair basketball to Europe at the International Stoke Mandville Games, albeit in the form of netball. Shortly following the Pan Am Jets' dominating performance at the International Stoke Mandville Games, wheelchair netball was switched to wheelchair basketball for all future Games.

History 
In 1960 the inaugural Rome Paralympic Games included wheelchair basketball as one of its initial events. During this inaugural 1960 Paralympic Games the wheelchair basketball competition was divided into two constructs: Class A for athletes with complete lesions, and Class B for those with incomplete lesions. With the 1960 Paralympic Games, the United States Men's National Wheelchair Basketball Team competed in both classifications, winning two gold medals. The same occurred in the following 1964 Tokyo Paralympic Games, as the United States Men's National Wheelchair Basketball Team claimed both gold medals.

The success of the United States Men's National Wheelchair Basketball Team has continued since those initial Paralympic Games, although the team had not won gold medals since 1988 and finally ended that drought in the most recent tournament in 2016.

The United States Men's Wheelchair Basketball Team also competes internationally in the International Wheelchair Basketball Federation's (IWBF) World Wheelchair Basketball Championships, the Parapan American Games, and the IWBF's U23 World Wheelchair Basketball Championships. The United States Men's National Wheelchair Basketball Team has enjoyed great success in each of these tournaments in addition to the Paralympic Games. They are the only team to have won the IWBF World Wheelchair Basketball Championships in three successive tournaments (accomplishing that feat twice; 1979-1986 & 1994-2002) and medalling in nearly every tournament held of the Parapan American Games, as well as the IWBF’s U23 World Wheelchair Basketball Championships.

Roster

Paralympic Games 
Results achieved at the Paralympic Games:
 1960:  Gold (2)
 1964:  Gold (2)
 1968:  Silver
 1972:  Gold
 1976:  Gold
 1980:  Bronze
 1984: 4th
 1988:  Gold
 1992:  Gold
 1996:  Bronze
 2000:  Bronze
 2004: 7th
 2008: 4th
 2012:  Bronze
 2016:  Gold
 2020:  Gold

IWBF World Championships

Other international tournaments

Parapan American Games

Men's U23 World Wheelchair Basketball Championships

See also

 Wheelchair basketball in the United States

References

 
Wheelchair basketball in the United States
Wheelchair
National men's wheelchair basketball teams